Atwater is an unincorporated community in Upson County, in the U.S. state of Georgia.

History
A post office called Atwater was established in 1901, and remained in operation until 1907. The community was incorporated in 1902.

References

Unincorporated communities in Upson County, Georgia